A bag (also known regionally as a sack) is a common tool in the form of a non-rigid container. The use of bags predates recorded history, with the earliest bags being lengths of animal skin, cotton, or woven plant fibers, folded up at the edges and secured in that shape with strings of the same material.

Despite their simplicity, bags have been fundamental for the development of human civilization, as they allow people to easily collect loose materials such as berries or food grains, and to transport more items than could readily be carried in the hands. The word probably has its origins in the Norse word baggi, from the reconstructed Proto-Indo-European bʰak, but is also comparable to the Welsh baich (load, bundle), and the Greek Τσιαντουλίτσα (Chandulícha, load).

Cheap disposable paper bags and plastic shopping bags are very common varying in size and strength in the retail trade as a convenience for shoppers, and are often supplied by the shop for free or for a small fee. Customers may also take their own shopping bags to use in shops. Although, paper had been used for purposes of wrapping and padding in ancient China since the 2nd century BC, the first use of paper bags (for preserving the flavor of tea) in China came during the later Tang Dynasty (618–907 AD).

History

Bags have been attested for thousands of years and have been used by both men and women. Bags have been prevalent as far back as ancient Egypt. Many hieroglyphs depict males with bags tied around their waists. The Bible mentions pouches, especially with regard to Judas Iscariot carrying one around, holding his personal items. In the 14th century, wary of pickpockets and thieves, many people used drawstring bags, in which to carry their money. These bags were attached to "girdles" via a long cord fastened to the waist.

The Australian dillybag is a traditional Australian Aboriginal bag generally woven from plant fibres. Dillybags were and are mainly designed and used by women to gather and transport food, and are most commonly found in the northern parts of Australia.

Women also wore more ornate drawstring bags, typically called hamondeys or tasques, to display their social status. The 14th-century handbags evolved into wedding gifts from groom to bride. These medieval pouches were embroidered, often with depictions of love stories or songs. Eventually, these pouches evolved into what were known as a chaneries, which were used for gaming or food for falcons. During the Renaissance, Elizabethan England's fashions were more ornate than ever before. Women's wore their pouches underneath the vast array of petticoats and men wore leather pockets or bagges inside their breeches. Aristocrats began carrying swete bagges filled with sweet-smelling material to make up for poor hygiene.

Modern

In the modern world, bags are ubiquitous, with many people routinely carrying a wide variety of them in the form of cloth or leather briefcases, handbags, and backpacks, and with bags made from more disposable materials such as paper or plastic being used for shopping, and to carry home groceries. A bag may be closable by a zipper, snap fastener, etc., or simply by folding (e.g. in the case of a paper bag). Sometimes a money bag or travel bags has a lock. The bag likely predates the inflexible variant, the basket, and bags usually have the additional advantage over baskets of being foldable or otherwise compressible to smaller sizes. On the other hand, baskets, being made of a more rigid material, may better protect their contents. 

An empty bag may or may not be very light and foldable to a small size. If it is, this is convenient for carrying it to the place where it is needed, such as a shop, and for storage of empty bags. Bags vary from small ones, like purses, to large ones for use in traveling like a suitcase. The pockets of clothing are also a kind of bag, built into the clothing for the carrying of suitably small objects.

Environmental aspects

There are environmental concerns regarding use and disposal of plastic shopping and trash bags. Efforts are being taken to control and reduce their use in some European Union countries, including Ireland and the Netherlands. In some cases the cheap bags are taxed so the customer must pay a fee where they may not have done previously. Sometimes heavy duty reusable plastic and fabric bags are sold, typically costing €0.50 to €1, and these may replace disposable bags entirely. Sometimes free replacements are offered when the bag wears out. The UK has charged 5p per plastic carrier bag in larger shops since 2015. This trend has spread to some cities in the United States. Recently many countries have banned the use of plastic bags. Paper bags emerge as a great replacement for plastic bags; however paper bags tend to be expensive compared to plastic bags.

A bag may or may not be disposable; however, even a disposable bag can often be used many times, for economic and environmental reasons. On the other hand, there may be logistic or hygienic reasons to use a bag only once. For example, a garbage bag is often disposed of with its content. A bag for packaging a disposable product is often disposed of when it is empty. Similarly, bags used as receptacles in medical procedures, such as the colostomy bag used to collect waste from a surgically diverted biological system, are typically disposed of as medical waste. Many snack foods, such as pretzels, cookies, and potato chips, are available in disposable single-use sealed bags.

Types of bags

 Antistatic bag (used for shipping electronic components)
 Backpack
 Bag-in-box
 BagIt
 Baguette
 Bin bag, Garbage bag, or Trash bag
 Blue bag
 Bivouac bag
 Body bag
 Book bag
 Booster bag
 Bota bag
 Bulk bag (a name for a flexible intermediate bulk container)
 Burn bag
 Carpet bag
 Cooler bag
 Diaper bag
 Diplomatic bag
 Douche bag
 Duffel bag
 Dunnage bag
 Flour sack
 Garment bag
 Gladstone bag
 Grab bag
 Gunny sack
 Handbag, Purse
 Hobo bag
 Ita-bag
 Lifting bag
 Mail bag
 Messenger bag
 Millbank bag
 Money bag
 Paper bag  
 Paper sack (multi-wall paper bag)
 Plastic bag  Cf., Sonali Bag
 Popcorn bag
 Sandbag
 Satchel
 Security bag
 Sling bag (worn over the shoulder)
 Shopping bag
 Plastic shopping bag
 Reusable shopping bag 
 Shopping trolley (caddy)
 Suicide bag
 Thermal bag
 Tote bag
 Travel bag or Suitcase
 Tucker bag
 Purse

Other
 Airbag (vehicle safety device)
 Bagpipes
 Bag valve mask
 Bean bag
 Bag valve mask
 Bota bag
 Bulgarian Bag
 Coin purse
 Coffee bag
 Ita-bag
 Milk bag* Oven bag
 Pastry bag
 Punching bag (a piece of physical training equipment)
 Perhaps-bag or Netted sack
 Portable hyperbaric bag
 Raschen bag
 Sachet
 Sleeping bag
 Sonali Bag
 Spice bag
 Tea bag
 Vacuum bag
 Zipper storage bag

See also 

 Bag (unit) (unit of measurement with various values)
 Bagger
 Bagg (disambiguation)
 Bag tag
 Sack (disambiguation)

References

External links
 
 

 
Domestic implements